Dactyladenia mannii is a species of plant in the family Chrysobalanaceae. It is endemic to Cameroon and Equatorial Guinea. It is threatened by habitat loss.

References

External links

mannii
Flora of Cameroon
Flora of Equatorial Guinea